Timothy James Sheehan  (February 13, 1868 – October 21, 1923) was an outfielder and first baseman for the St. Louis Browns of the National League in 1895 and 1896. His minor league career stretched from 1889 through 1899.

External links
 

1868 births
1923 deaths
19th-century baseball players
St. Louis Browns (NL) players
Baseball players from Hartford, Connecticut
Major League Baseball first basemen
Major League Baseball outfielders
Jersey City Jerseys players
Fall River Indians players
Springfield Ponies players
Springfield Maroons players
Little Rock Travelers players
Hartford Bluebirds players
Newark Colts players
Toronto Canucks players
Buffalo Bisons (minor league) players
Johnstown Mormans players
Palmyra Mormans players
Bristol Bell Makers players
Hartford Indians players